Mud Creek Falls is a waterfall located in the small resort city of Sky Valley, Georgia in Rabun County, Georgia that cascades for over 100 feet eventually into Estatoah Falls near Dillard, Georgia.  No hiking is required to reach the falls. It is reachable by car and has parking within 50-75 feet and is usually accommodating to handicapped. Above Mud Creek Fals is Spring Lake.

Waterfalls of Georgia (U.S. state)
Protected areas of Rabun County, Georgia
Chattahoochee-Oconee National Forest
Waterfalls of Rabun County, Georgia